Gianfranco Iannotta (born January 24, 1994) is an American track and field athlete.

Early life and education
Iannotta was born to parents Franco and Luz Iannotta on January 24, 1994. He was born with spina bifida and was paralyzed from the waist down upon birth. Iannotta graduated from Garfield High School in 2012.

Career
Iannotta made his national debut with Team USA at the 2011 Parapan American Games. As a result of his success, he was invited to the qualifying rounds for the 2012 Summer Paralympics but failed to qualify for the final roster to London.

After his high school graduation, Iannotta was selected to compete with Team USA at the 2013 IPC Athletics World Championships. He won a bronze medal in the 100 meter race, and a silver medal in the 200m.

Three years later, Iannotta made his Paralympic Games debut during the 2016 Summer Paralympics. He earned Team USA's first 2016 Paralympic gold medal in track with a time of 17.17 seconds, beating the previous medalist Raymond Martin. Iannotta ended the Games with a bronze medal in the 400-meter race. The following year, he was named to Team USAs roster for the 2017 World Para Athletics Championships, where he won a bronze medal in the men's T52 100.

Iannotta later took home a gold medal in the men's 100m T52 wheelchair event at the 2019 World Para Athletics Grand Prix with a time of 17.19. Due to his success, Iannotta was selected to compete with Team USA at the 2019 World Para Athletics Championships. At these championships he won the silver medal in the men's 100 metres T52 event and he qualified to represent the United States at the 2020 Summer Paralympics.

References 

1994 births
Living people
Garfield High School (New Jersey) alumni
People from Garfield, New Jersey
Sportspeople from Bergen County, New Jersey
Sportspeople from Passaic, New Jersey
Track and field athletes from New Jersey
Paralympic gold medalists for the United States
Paralympic bronze medalists for the United States
Medalists at the 2016 Summer Paralympics
People with spina bifida
Athletes (track and field) at the 2016 Summer Paralympics
Paralympic medalists in athletics (track and field)
Paralympic track and field athletes of the United States
Medalists at the 2011 Parapan American Games
Medalists at the 2015 Parapan American Games
Medalists at the 2019 Parapan American Games
Medalists at the World Para Athletics Championships
Athletes (track and field) at the 2020 Summer Paralympics
American people of Italian descent